Trupanea okinawaensis is a species of tephritid or fruit flies in the genus Trupanea of the family Tephritidae.

Distribution
Japan.

References

Tephritinae
Insects described in 1968
Diptera of Asia